The Stranger is a 2022 Australian psychological crime thriller film written and directed by Thomas M. Wright, starring Joel Edgerton and Sean Harris. Based on the non-fiction book The Sting: The Undercover Operation That Caught Daniel Morcombe's Killer by Kate Kyriacou, and inspired by the murder investigation of Daniel Morcombe, the film follows an investigation of a child abduction case, with an undercover police officer (Edgerton) in a sting operation tasked with getting close to and forming a friendship with the prime suspect (Harris).

The film premiered at the Cannes Film Festival on 18 May 2022, under the Un Certain Regard section. It had a limited theatrical release in Australia by Transmission Films on 6 October 2022 and streamed worldwide on Netflix on 19 October. The film received positive reviews from critics.

Plot 
The police suspect Henry Teague of the abduction and murder of a young teen but lack proof. They use the Mr. Big procedure to elicit a confession while continuing to search for evidence. Undercover police officer Paul Emery introduces himself to Teague during a long bus ride and strikes up a friendship with him. After gaining Teague's confidence and sympathy, Emery introduces him to a criminal acquaintance, Mark Frame. Frame, who is also an undercover police officer, offers Teague low-level work in a supposed criminal organisation. Frame and Emery emphasise that the organisation values honesty above all, and they push Teague to reveal any criminal history that could jeopardise it. Teague admits to having been in and out of jail, culminating in a two-year sentence for assault, but claims to be otherwise clean.

The undercover officers portray Emery as having gotten himself into a great deal of trouble, which the organisation clears up through their police contacts. Teague is recruited in helping to get a fake passport and plane ticket out of the country for Emery. Before pretending to leave the country, Emery urges Teague to trust Frame and be honest with the organisation, which he says will protect him. Frame becomes a mentor to Teague, drawing him further into the organisation and introducing him to increasingly influential figures, all of whom are secretly undercover police officers. Teague comes to rely on Mark for companionship in addition to the work and confesses an abstract sexual interest in him. Frame relays any information gained from Teague to Detective Senior Constable Kate Rylett, who investigates it further.

Rylett finds holes in Teague's alibi for the night of the abduction and uncovers the fact that, under a different name, he had been convicted for an earlier assault of another child; this convinces her of his guilt. After Teague briefly disappears, the police fear he may be getting anxious. Police officers pretending to be dirty relay information to Teague that he is about to be charged. Frame tells Teague that the head of the organisation, John, needs to see him. John reminds Teague that his organisation can give him a new life, as they did with Emery. To make this possible, John says Teague must reveal all the details of the crime so the evidence can be erased. Frame becomes agitated as John nervously bumbles some of his lines. However, Teague is convinced to confess and takes the undercover police officers to the scene of the crime, where he is arrested. After a long and painstaking search for evidence, one of the dozens of officers finds something in the dirt.

Haunted by the case, Frame has trouble sleeping and becomes overprotective of his young son.

Cast
 Joel Edgerton as "Mark Frame"
 Sean Harris as Henry Peter Teague / Peter Morley
 Jada Alberts as Detective Senior Constable Kate Rylett
 Cormac Wright as Mark's son
 Steve Mouzakis as Paul Emery
 Matthew Sunderland as Controller / Detective Sergeant Cross
 Fletcher Humphrys as Detective Senior Constable Graham Ikin
 Alan Dukes as John
 Ewen Leslie as Assistant Commissioner Milliken 
 Gary Waddell as WA Head
 Brendan Cooney as Senior Victorian Detective
 Jeff Lang as Milliken Offsider

Production
In April 2020, during the COVID-19 pandemic in Australia, it was announced that the film, under the working title, The Unknown Man, would begin filming in South Australia as soon as enough of the COVID-19 restrictions were lifted. Written and directed by Wright, it was produced by and stars Joel Edgerton. Sean Harris played the second lead role. The film was originally announced at Berlin's European Film Market in February, and was made by Anonymous Content and See-Saw Films, with support from Screen Australia and the South Australian Film Corporation.

Principal photography of the film began on 29 October 2020 in Australia.

Reception
  

In July 2022, due to the film being inspired by the Daniel Morcombe murder investigation, Morcombe's parents "demanded" that the filmmakers stop using his name to market the film and were upset that they continued to do so.

The producers of the film responded with a statement: "The Stranger is a fictionalised account of the undercover police operation that resulted in a successful murder prosecution. Out of our deepest respect for the family, the name of the victim is never mentioned in the film and the film does not depict any details of the murder. Nor is the family represented in the film in any way. Instead it tells the story of the unknown police professionals who committed years of their lives and their mental and physical health to resolve this case and others like it. When the film was first in development, the producers approached the family to make them aware of the film. They declined to be involved. It is a decision we continue to respect."

References

External links
 
 

2022 crime thriller films
2020s Australian films
2020s English-language films
Anonymous Content films
Australian crime thriller films
Australian films based on actual events
English-language Netflix original films
Films based on non-fiction books
Films shot in Australia
Films set in Australia
See-Saw Films films
Transmission Films films